The Franciscan Church is a place of worship in Cluj-Napoca, Romania. It was built between 1260 and 1290, on the site of an older Catholic church destroyed during the Tatar invasions in 1241.

History 
In 1390, the Benedictine monks received the church. They extended it and built a small Gothic cloister near the church, with the help of John Hunyadi.

In 1556, the Queen of Hungary, Isabella Jagiełło moved to the cloister and lived there with her son John II Sigismund Zápolya until 1557.

The church is located on Museum Square (Piața Muzeului), previously known as the Little Square (Piața Mică) to distinguish it from the Large Square surrounding St. Michael's Church; Caroline Square (Piața Carolina or Karolina ter), after the nearby Caroline Obelisk built in honor of the 1817 visit of Caroline Augusta of Bavaria and her husband Francis II; and Dimitrov Square (Piața Dimitrov), so named in the early communist period for Georgi Dimitrov.

Notes

References
 Lukacs Jozsef - Povestea „oraşului-comoară”, Editura Biblioteca Apostrof, Cluj-Napoca, 2005
 Bodea Gheorghe - Clujul vechi şi nou, Cluj-Napoca, 2002

External links 
 Biserica şi fosta mănăstire franciscană din Cluj (The Franciscan church and cloister from Cluj-Napoca)
 Old pictures of the church and cloister

Churches in Cluj-Napoca
13th-century Roman Catholic church buildings in Romania
Baroque church buildings in Romania
Churches completed in 1290
Franciscan churches
Roman Catholic Archdiocese of Alba Iulia
Historic monuments in Cluj County